The discography of Fleet Foxes, a Seattle-based indie folk and folk rock band, consists of four studio albums, three extended plays (EP), and nine singles. Fleet Foxes was formed in 2006 by vocalist Robin Pecknold and guitarist Skyler Skjelset, and were then joined by keyboardist Casey Wescott, bassist Bryn Lumsden, and drummer Nicholas Peterson.

With producer Phil Ek, the band recorded their first demo in 2006, the self-released Fleet Foxes EP. The group subsequently signed with acclaimed UK indie label Bella Union in Europe and Warner Music subsidiary record label Sub Pop for the USA, early in 2008. The band's performance at the South by Southwest festival in March caught the attention of the international press; a month later, Fleet Foxes released their second EP, Sun Giant, to critical acclaim. Their first full-length album, Fleet Foxes, was released in June and peaked at number three in the United Kingdom, where it was certified platinum. The album was also certified gold in the US. "Mykonos", a single from Sun Giant, was released in 2009 and reached the top 20 in Belgium and Scotland, and peaked at 51 in the UK.

Fleet Foxes' second album, Helplessness Blues, was released in 2011 and entered the top 10 in the US, Australia, Belgium, Canada, the Netherlands, Norway, Sweden, and the UK. It was nominated in the Best Folk Album category at the 54th Annual Grammy Awards. After a six-year hiatus, Fleet Foxes released a lyric video for the song "Third of May / Ōdaigahara" in March 2017. The band's third studio album, Crack-Up, was released June 16, 2017 on Nonesuch Records. On September 22, 2020, their fourth album, Shore, was released via Anti- Records at exactly 13:31 UCT to coincide with the September equinox.

Albums

Studio albums

Live albums

Compilation albums

Extended plays

Singles

As lead artist

As featured artist

Guest appearances

Music videos

Traditional videos

Lyric videos

Notes

References

External links
 Official website
 Fleet Foxes at AllMusic
 
 

Discographies of American artists
Folk music discographies